Madhav National Park is situated in Shivpuri District of Gwalior division in northwest Madhya Pradesh, India.  Two national highways pass through the park, the Agra to Bombay former National Highway 3 and the Jhansi to Shivpuri National Highway 27 (formerly N.H.25). 

The park was first noticed in 1956, at 167 km2, as Shivpuri National Park. In 1958, it was renamed Madhav National Park after Madho Rao Scindia, the Maharaja of Gwalior belonging to the Scindia dynasty of the Marathas, and was finalized the following year. Sakhya Sagar, a man-made reservoir within the park, has been designated as a Ramsar site since 2022.

Geography
There are several small ponds in this national park, but the largest body of water is Sankhya Sagar, a reservoir, constructed for Madho Rao Scindia when it was still his hunting grounds. He also had constructed a second smaller reservoir, Madhav Sagar, known as Madhav Lake. A third reservoir was not included in the park.

Located in the ecoregion of Khathiar-Gir dry deciduous forests, this national park has a varied terrain of forested hills and flat grasslands around the reservoir and is thus rich in biodiversity. The average rainfall is 816 mm.

History
Shivpuri town in the state of Madhya Pradesh was formerly the summer capital and a much larger park was the former hunting preserve of the Scindia maharajas of Ujjain and Gwalior.

After the independence of India, the area suffered degradation. Agriculture and mining encroached on the former hunting grounds. Although the park was  noticed in 1956, at 167 km2, as Shivpuri National Park and became the renamed Madhav National Park in 1959, degradation continued.  The last of the resident wild tigers were seen in Madhav National Park around late 1970.  In 1982 a plan to add a new part of the park along the Sindh River was proposed.  This expansion area included a corridor joining it to the original 167 km2, which when completed would bring the park to 354 km2. (See map below in external links.)

As late as the 1990s there was little effort to improve the conditions in the park. Illegal mining and questionable mining permits led to significant degradation in the park, so that in the 1990s conservationists took the matter the Supreme Court of India and by 1998 received an injunction terminating mining in the area.

Sights and facilities
On the shores of Sakhya Sagar lake which edges the forests, is a boat club, from where the park visitors can see a number of migratory birds especially in winter, when many migratory waterfowls visit the area. A viewing lodge constructed by the Maharaja called the Shooting Box, is situated above the Sakhya Sagar lake. In the older days one could shoot wildlife, both with a gun and camera from here. Visitors could sit under cover and watch a tiger at a kill. All around the lake (at suitable points), the Maharaja constructed boat landing areas, picnic shelters, watch towers, hides, etc. and a network of well laid out metalled roads.

George Castle 

At the highest elevation in Madhav National Park, is the George Castle (Bankhade Kothi). In 1911, the local Scindia ruler Madho Rao Scindia built the castle in his hunting park for an overnight stay by King George V of the United Kingdom. George V had intended to go tiger shooting there during his visit to India. However, the king shot a tiger before getting there, and did not stop at George Castle afterall. Although in some disrepair, it is a "turreted English-style castle, with Belgian glass windows and Italian tile flooring."

See also
 Wildlife of India

Notes and references

External links
 

Khathiar-Gir dry deciduous forests
National parks in Madhya Pradesh
Protected areas established in 1959
Tourist attractions in Shivpuri district
1959 establishments in Madhya Pradesh
Ramsar sites in India